The Portugal men's national under-16 basketball team is a national basketball team of Portugal, administered by the Portuguese Basketball Federation. It represents the country in men's international under-16 basketball competitions.

FIBA U16 European Championship participations

See also
Portugal men's national basketball team
Portugal men's national under-19 basketball team
Portugal women's national under-17 basketball team

References

External links
Official website 
Archived records of Portugal team participations

Men's national under-16 basketball teams
Basketball